The 1983 Critérium du Dauphiné Libéré was the 35th edition of the cycle race and was held from 30 May to 6 June 1983. The race started in Sallanches and finished in Pierrelatte. The race was won by Greg LeMond of the Renault-Elf team. Pascal Simon, the initial winner, tested positive for Micorene and was given a time penalty, which resulted in his demotion to fourth place.

Teams
Eleven teams, containing a total of 99 riders, participated in the race:

 
 
 
 
 
 Saint-Etienne–Pélussin
 
 
 
 
 Poland amateur team

Route

Stages

Prologue
30 May 1983 — Sallanches,  (ITT)

Stage 1
31 May 1983 — Sallanches to Oyonnax,

Stage 2a
1 June 1983 — Oyonnax to Bourg-en-Bresse,

Stage 2b
1 June 1983 — Bourg-en-Bresse to Le Creusot,

Stage 3
2 June 1983 — Le Creusot to Firminy,

Stage 4
3 June 1983 — Voreppe to Lyon,

Stage 5
4 June 1983 — Voreppe to Briançon,

Stage 6
5 June 1983 — Gap to Gap,

Stage 7a
6 June 1983 — Carpentras to Montélimar,

Stage 7b
6 June 1983 — Montélimar to Pierrelatte,  (ITT)

Pascal Simon, the original winner of the race, was declassified to fourth place for doping.

General classification

Notes

References

Further reading

1983
1983 in French sport
1983 Super Prestige Pernod
May 1983 sports events in Europe
June 1983 sports events in Europe